Sandstone (also New Richmond or New River Falls) is an unincorporated community in Summers County, West Virginia, United States.  It lies along West Virginia Route 20 and the New River to the north of the city of Hinton, the county seat of Summers County.   Its elevation is 1,352 feet (412 m).  It has a post office, with the ZIP code of 25985.

Historic variant names were New River Falls and New Richmond. Sandstone takes its name from an old sandstone quarry.

Sandstone is the birthplace of Cornelius Burdette, winner of an Olympic gold medal during the 1912 Summer Olympics.  Part of Paramount's 1994 film Lassie was shot here.

Sandstone Falls

Sandstone Falls is located on the New River to the south of the community.

Sandstone Visitors Center 

The Sandstone Visitors Center was built by the National Park Service in order to provide outreach and awareness to the various environmental issues along the New River Gorge.  It is located 1 mile off the Sandstone Exit on I-64 not far from the Mary Draper Ingles crossing.  The facility is earth friendly with local and recycled materials comprising its structure, and native plants in a xeriscaping project absorb rainfall and thermal heat.   An interactive museum is part of the draw for its thousands of visitors.

References

Unincorporated communities in Summers County, West Virginia
Unincorporated communities in West Virginia